Abantis ja, the Djah paradise skipper, is a butterfly in the family Hesperiidae. The species was first described by Hamilton Herbert Druce in 1909. It is found in Ivory Coast, Ghana, Cameroon, the Republic of the Congo and the Central African Republic. The habitat consists of forests.

References

Butterflies described in 1909
Tagiadini